Abbe Creek is a stream in Linn County, Iowa, in the United States.

Abbe Creek was named for William Abbe, who settled there.

Variant names
According to the Geographic Names Information System, it has also been known historically as:
Abby Creek

Course
Abbe Creek rises about 4 miles southwest of Martelle, Iowa in Linn County and then flows generally west to join the Big Creek about 0.25 miles northeast of Bertram.

Watershed
Abbe Creek drains  of area, receives about 35.7 in/year of precipitation, and has a wetness index of 470.72 and is about 8% forested.

See also
List of rivers of Iowa

References

Rivers of Linn County, Iowa
Rivers of Iowa